Fibra óptica ("Fibre Optic") is a 1998 Mexican film.

Cast
 Roberto Sosa - Marco Antonio Gutiérrez
 Lumi Cavazos - María Ponce
 Angélica Aragón - Doña Carmen
 Alberto Estrella - The Young Executive
 Eduardo Ocaña - Licenciado Magaña
 Mónica Ribeiro - Claudia Jiménez
 Jorge Galván - The Informer
 Christianne Gout - Rebeca (as Christiane Gout)
 Guillermo Huesca - Messenger
 Emilio Guerrero -Doctor

External links
 

1998 films
Mexican thriller drama films
1990s Spanish-language films
1990s Mexican films